Khaneqah (also Romanized as Khāneqāh) is a village in Sefid Sang Rural District, Qalandarabad District, Fariman County, Razavi Khorasan Province, Iran. At the 2006 census, its population was 26, in 6 families.

References 

Populated places in Fariman County